Kilakone Siphonexay (born 2 June 1989 in Vientiane, Laos) is a Laotian runner who competed at the 2012 Summer Olympics in the 100 m event. He was the flag bearer of Laos during the opening ceremony.

References

External links
 

1989 births
Living people
People from Vientiane
Laotian male sprinters
Olympic athletes of Laos
Athletes (track and field) at the 2012 Summer Olympics